Železná may refer to:

Železná (Beroun District), village and municipality in the Central Bohemian Region of the Czech Republic
Železná Breznica, village and municipality of the Zvolen District in the Banská Bystrica Region of Slovakia
Železná Ruda, town in the Pilsen Region of the Czech Republic

See also 
Bratislava Železná studienka railway station, Bratislava, Slovakia

Železný (male form)
Železnice
Železnik
Železniki

Železné
Železník (disambiguation)
Željeznica (disambiguation)